Frank Alfred Linzy (born September 15, 1940) is an American former professional baseball player, used almost exclusively as a relief pitcher. Over the course of his Major League Baseball (MLB) career, Linzy played for the San Francisco Giants (–), St. Louis Cardinals (–), Milwaukee Brewers (–), and Philadelphia Phillies. He batted and threw right-handed.

Major league career
In Linzy's first full MLB season, he finished 13th in voting for the NL Most Valuable Player (won by his teammate, Willie Mays) and 3rd in voting for Rookie of the Year (won by Dodger Jim Lefebvre). That year, the hard-throwing righty had arguably his best season, in which he tallied a 9–3 win–loss (W-L) record, 57 games (G), 40 games finished (GF), 21 saves (SV), 81 innings pitched (IP), allowing 76 hits (H), 19 runs (R), 13 earned runs (ER), 2 home Runs (HR), 23 walks (BB), notching 35 strikeouts (SO), hitting 3 batsmen (HBP), making 5 wild pitches (WP), facing 334 batters (BFP), yielding 8 intentional walks (IBB), and posting a 1.43 earned run average (ERA).

Linzy had only two games started (GS), over 11 MLB seasons. But he was not a "closer," in the modern sense of the word; Linzy was more of a 1960s "fireman," in that the Giants called upon him at any time — not just in the 9th inning — but in the 7th, the 8th, or whenever the opposition was threatening to score late in a tight game.

Linzy's big league totals include a record of 62–57 W-L, 516 G, 2 GS, 342 GF, 110 SV, 817 IP, 790 H, 315 R, 259 ER, 35 HR, 282 BB, 358 SO, 14 HBP, 30 WP, 3,454 BFP, 97 IBB, 1  balk (BK), and a 2.85 ERA.

References

External links

Frank Linzy at SABR (Baseball BioProject)
Frank Linzy at Baseball Almanac

1940 births
Living people
Baseball players from Oklahoma
Eugene Emeralds players
Hawaii Islanders players
Major League Baseball pitchers
Milwaukee Brewers players
People from Fort Gibson, Oklahoma
Philadelphia Phillies players
Quincy Giants players
Reading Phillies players
St. Louis Cardinals players
Salem Rebels players
Springfield Giants players
San Francisco Giants players
Tacoma Giants players